Kujō Motoie (九条基家, 1203-1280) was a waka poet and Japanese nobleman active in the early Kamakura period.

External links 
E-text of his poems in Japanese

Japanese male poets
1203 deaths
1280 deaths
Fujiwara clan
Kujō family
People of Kamakura-period Japan
13th-century Japanese poets